Leionema lamprophyllum, commonly known as shiny phebalium,  is a shrub species that is endemic to Australia. It grows up to 2 metres in height, with leaves that are 3–10 mm long and 2–4 mm wide. White  flowers are produced in spring.

Three subspecies are recognised:
Leionema lamprophyllum (F.Muell.) Paul G.Wilson  subsp. lamprophyllum 
Leionema lamprophyllum subsp. obovatum F.M.Anderson 
Leionema lamprophyllum subsp. orbiculare F.M.Anderson

The species occurs in New South Wales, Victoria and the Australian Capital Territory.

References

External links

lamprophyllum
Sapindales of Australia
Flora of the Australian Capital Territory
Flora of New South Wales
Flora of Victoria (Australia)
Taxa named by Ferdinand von Mueller